The 1936–37 Copa México was the 20th staging of this Mexican football cup competition that existed since 1907.

The competition started on October 3, 1937 and concluded on October 24, 1937 in which Asturias lifted the trophy for the fifth time after a 5–3 victory over América.

Preliminary round

Final phase

References
Mexico - Statistics of Copa México in season 1936/1937. (RSSSF)

Copa Mexico, 1936-37
Copa MX
Copa